General Sanchez may refer to:

Ricardo Sanchez (born 1953), U.S. Army lieutenant general
Fernando García Sánchez (born 1953), Spanish Navy admiral general
Otilio Montaño Sánchez (1887–1917), Zapatista general in the Mexican Revolution

See also
Antonio Barroso Sánchez-Guerra (1893–1982), Spanish Army general